Malpensa Aeroporto railway station may refer to:

Malpensa Aeroporto Terminal 1 railway station
Malpensa Aeroporto Terminal 2 railway station